The Wallachian dialect (//) is one of the several dialects of the Romanian language (Daco-Romanian). Its geographic distribution covers approximately the historical region of Wallachia, occupying the southern part of Romania, roughly between the Danube and the Southern Carpathians. Standard Romanian, in particular its phonology, is largely based on Wallachian.

As with all other Romanian dialects, Wallachian is distinguished primarily by its phonetic characteristics and only marginally by morphological, syntactical, and lexical features.

The Wallachian dialect is the only member of the southern grouping of Romanian dialects. All the other dialects and speech varieties are classified in the northern grouping, whose most typical representative is the Moldavian dialect.

The Wallachian and the Moldavian dialects are the only two that have been consistently identified and recognized by linguists. They are clearly distinguished in dialect classifications made by Heimann Tiktin, Mozes Gaster, Gustav Weigand, Sextil Pușcariu, Sever Pop, Emil Petrovici, Romulus Todoran, Ion Coteanu, Alexandru Philippide, Iorgu Iordan, Emanuel Vasiliu, and others, whereas the other dialects and speech varieties have proven to be considerably more controversial and difficult to classify.

Geographic distribution

The Wallachian dialect is spoken in the southern part of Romania, in the region of Wallachia. More accurately, it covers the following counties:

in Muntenia (Muntenian dialect, but in Teleorman there is a little influence from Oltenian dialect): Argeș, Brăila (mostly in southern half and central also spoken in north but with some Moldavian influences), Buzău (mostly in southern half and central also spoken in north but with some Moldavian influences), Călărași, Dâmbovița, Giurgiu, Ialomița, Ilfov and Bucharest, Prahova, Teleorman;
in Oltenia (Oltenian dialect): Dolj, Gorj (eastern part), Mehedinți (mostly eastern part, not in Banat), Olt, Vâlcea;
in Northern Dobruja (Dobrujan dialect who has some Muntenian influence but many Moesic words from their heritage): Constanța and the southern half of the Tulcea County (in the northern half the Moldavian dialect is spoken).
in southern Transylvania (in fact Transylvanian dialect but with a group influence from Muntenian): Brașov and the southern part of the Sibiu County.
 in the Romanian diaspora (groups usually speak the Wallachian dialects)

The most typical features of the Wallachian dialect are found in the central part of this area, specifically in the following counties: Argeș, Călărași, Dâmbovița, Giurgiu, Ialomița, Olt, and Teleorman.

Influences from the neighboring areas

The dialects spoken in the neighboring areas have influenced the Wallachian dialect, thus creating transition speech varieties, as follows:

in the northeastern edge there is an influence from the Moldavian dialect;
in the northern area, across the southern Carpathian mountains, influences from the central and southern Transylvanian speech varieties are found;
in the northwestern part, influences are felt from the Banat dialect and the Hațeg Land speech varieties.

Subdivisions

Some researchers further divide the Wallachian dialect into finer speech varieties. This division, however, can no longer rely on clear and systematic phonetic features, but on morphological, syntactical, and lexical differences.

For instance, Sextil Pușcariu and others consider a separate speech variety in Oltenia. This has very few distinct features – such as the extensive use of the simple perfect tense – and is most often considered a transition speech variety from the Wallachian to the Banat dialect.

Even less distinct is the particular speech variety of Dobruja. This too is often considered a transition variety, between the Wallachian and the Moldavian dialects.

Particularities

Phonetic features

The Wallachian dialect has the following phonetic particularities that contrast it with the other dialects and varieties. Many of these phonetic features are also found in the pronunciation of Standard Romanian.

The postalveolars  are preserved: .
Contrast is made between the affricate  and the fricative .
Except in Oltenia, after the dentals , the vowels  and the diphthong  are preserved: . This occurs simultaneously with a slight palatalization of those dentals.
After the fricatives  and after , the vowel  changes to : . The two fricatives are pronounced slightly palatalized.
The diphthong  is preserved: .
The diphthong  in old Romanian becomes  in certain phonetic contexts: .
The front vowel ending is anticipated by inserting  in the words .
The labials  remain unchanged before front vowels and : . In some areas of Wallachian, palatalized labials can be found today, but these appeared as a consequence of recent population migrations.
The dentals  do not change before front vowels and glides: .

Morphological and syntactical features

When the object of a verb is another verb, the latter is in its subjunctive form: ,  ('I want to leave, he knows how to swim').
The following imperative forms are found: , .
Feminine names in the vocative case end in -o: Leano, Anico.
This makes the Muntenian plural homonymous with the singular in the 3rd person.
In Muntenia, an additional -ără is attached to the compound perfect of verbs: ,  ('I/we sang', compare with standard).
In Oltenia, the simple perfect is frequently used in all persons and reflects the aspect of a recently finished action. For speakers of other Romanian dialects, this is by far the single most known particularity of the Oltenian speech, which most readily identifies its speakers.
In Oltenia, feminine nouns ending in -ă tend to form the plurals with the ending -i to avoid the homonymy that would occur in nouns whose root ends in :  –  ('house – houses', compare with standard  – ).
In Oltenia, the adverb  is used without negation:  ('She has only one child', compare with standard ). This phenomenon is also increasingly found in Muntenia.

Lexical particularities

In Oltenia, the derivation with the suffix -ete is very productive:  ('male sparrow', standard ),  ('corner'),  ('pumpkin'). It also appears in proper names: Ciuculete, Ionete, Purcărete.
Other specific words:  ('corn cob', standard ),  ('mouse trap'),  ('coffin'),  ('flower pot'),  ('swelling'), etc.

Sample

Wallachian dialect:  

Standard Romanian: 
 
English translation: "The child's parents go to the midwife with the child. They bring as a present bread, wine, meat, țuică. And the midwife puts a pretzel on his head and hoists him up, touches him to the house's girder, and says: Long live the child and his parents!"

See also
Romanian phonology

References

Bibliography

Vasile Ursan, "Despre configurația dialectală a dacoromânei actuale", Transilvania (new series), 2008, No. 1, pp. 77–85 
Ilona Bădescu, "Dialectologie", teaching material for the University of Craiova 
Elena Buja, Liliana Coposescu, Gabriela Cusen, Luiza Meseșan Schmitz, Dan Chiribucă, Adriana Neagu, Iulian Pah, Raport de țară: România, country report for the Lifelong Learning Programme MERIDIUM 

Romanian language varieties and styles
Wallachia